The 1856 Djijelli earthquakes occurred on August 21 and 22 near the coastal area of northern Algeria. The magnitude of the two shocks are unknown, but each had a maximum Mercalli intensity of IX (Violent). Each of these high intensity shocks were felt as far as Genoa in Northern Italy and were followed by a tsunami that affected the Mediterranean Sea. Three people were killed as a result of the second event.

See also
List of earthquakes in Algeria
List of historical earthquakes
List of tsunamis

References

Further reading

1856 earthquakes
Earthquakes in Algeria
1856 tsunamis
August 1856 events
1856 in Africa
Tsunamis in Algeria
Earthquake clusters, swarms, and sequences
19th century in Algeria
1856 disasters in Africa
19th-century disasters in Algeria